Cheyenne Regional Medical Center (CRMC) is a hospital located in Cheyenne, Wyoming, USA.  CRMC is divided into three campuses.

CRMC West Building 
The West Building hosts acute-care services including a trauma center, inpatient and outpatient surgery, intensive care, physical therapy, obstetrics, neurology, cardiology, oncology, orthopedics, and endoscopy.

CRMC East Building 
The East Building handles most of the outpatient services for the hospital, including a rehabilitation center and behavioral health services. This campus does not have an Emergency Department

CRMC Health and Fitness 
CRMC Health and Fitness offers physical therapy and full-service fitness facilities.

External links 
Cheyenne Regional Medical Center Official Website

Hospitals in Wyoming
Trauma centers